Gwendwr Gardens is a small park in West Kensington. In 1948 the area was donated to Fulham Council by the Gunter Estate for a memorial to the victims of German air raids in the area, particularly the Operation Steinbock raid on the night of 20 February 1944.

The park contains a sunken area with a pond, lawns and a commemorative plaque.

References 

Parks and open spaces in the Royal Borough of Kensington and Chelsea